The Sound of the Natural State is the marching band of Arkansas State University, located in Jonesboro, Arkansas. The band is directed by Dr. Steven Riley.

About
Described as "one of Arkansas State's greatest assets" by Arkansas State's former chancellor, Robert Potts, The SOUND is built on the long tradition of outstanding bands at Arkansas State.  'The Sound' is a premiere college marching band utilizing a corps style performance to produce a high energy precision show. Never to disappoint a crowd, the 'Sound of the Natural State' is well respected by colleges and high schools all across the country.  Past Directors have included Mr. Donald Minx, Dr. Tom O'Connor, Ms. Pat Brumbaugh, Dr. Tom O'Neal, Mr. Ed Alexander, Dr. Sarah Labovitz, and Dr. Polly Middleton. The Director of Bands and Coordinator of Instrumental Activities, Arkansas State, is Dr. Timothy Oliver.

Throughout the past decade, under the talented leadership of those listed above, the band has enjoyed continued growth; both in numbers of artists participating and numbers of performances.  Currently the SOUND performance schedule includes all home football games, several away games each season, as well as three exhibitions performances for area marching contests.  The busy schedule fosters outstanding time management among the college students, representing every major in the STATE Course Catalog.  The group rehearses Tuesday through Friday from 3:30 PM until 5:00 PM at the Marching Band Practice Facility on the Jonesboro campus.  Enjoying outstanding support from the institution, a large number of SOUND musicians receive Band Performance Scholarships regardless of major.

Organization

Winds and percussion

Currently, the instrumentation of Sound of the Natural State includes:
 Piccolos
 Flutes
 Clarinets
 Alto Saxophones
 Tenor Saxophones
 Trumpets
 Mellophones
 Trombones
 Euphoniums
 Tubas (Sousaphones)
 Drumline
 Color guard (flag spinning)
 Majorette (dancer)

Traditions

Order of the Pack
Formerly known as "The Order of the Tribe", The Order of the Pack is an important gathering of current students, alumni, athletes, faculty, and administration to carry forward the history of the institution and teach the crowd the music, cheers and chants used to cheer on the ASU football team at the first home game of the season. The Sound of the Natural State is one of the most noticeable groups participating in The Order of the Pack, performing for the crowd the ASU Fight Song "ASU Loyalty", the ASU Alma Mater "Hail to ASU", and various pep tunes of the season.

Pregame
The football pregame performance at Arkansas State University is led by the Sound of the Natural State. The band performs a traditional pregame show that includes "Patriots on Parade", "The Star Spangled Banner", "Hail to ASU", "ASU Loyalty".

References

Arkansas State University
Sun Belt Conference marching bands
Musical groups established in 1909
1909 establishments in Arkansas